Dr. Gurusamy Bridge is a road bridge on McNichols Road across the Coovum River connecting Chetpet with Nungambakkam in India. It is named after the medical practitioner and former professor of Madras Medical College, Dr M.R. Guruswami Mudaliar.

References 
 

Bridges and flyovers in Chennai
Road bridges in India